La Felguera is a parish of Langreo, and the most important district in the municipality of Langreo (Principality of Asturias) in northern Spain, with 21.000 inhabitants. It is located 18 minutes by car to Oviedo, the capital of Asturias. La Felguera is close to the Nalón River.

History
In the 19th and first half of the 20th century, La Felguera was one of the most important iron and steelworks centers in Spain, located inside the mining region of Asturias. In 1858, Pedro Duro founded the Felguera Factory (currently DF Group) one of the most influential coal and iron-work enterprises in Spain.

The town was the first production site in Spain for: sheet steel for shipbuilding (1887), refractory bricks (1896), railways (1868), chemical products derived from ethylene (1957) and synthetic ammonia (1925). It also had the largest blast furnace in Spain in 1943. It was also an important point at workers' struggle. In addition La Felguera was declared the greatest cultural point of Europe by UNESCO in 1961. Before the 19th century, the parish was a group of small villages dedicated to livestock and agriculture.

La Felguera has numerous annual celebrations (like Saint Peter's Fiestas or Day of the Cider) and an art gallery, Pinacoteca Eduardo Úrculo. The International Tales Competition is one of the most important in the Spanish language. Today, it shelters the center of new companies and technologies Valnalón and the Museum of the Siderurgy.

Industrial Heritage site 
Important buildings are the church of San Pedro, the chapel El Llungéru, the former iron works factory Duro Felguera, engineers' houses in the street Conde Sizzo, former La Salle trade school, the engineers' chalet, Pedro Duro's statue, the Urquijo neighborhood, railway station, the former Nitrastur factory, the market and three parks (Dolores Duro, Sutu and García Lago).

Gallery

References

External links
 Villa de La Felguera

Parishes in Langreo
Langreo